La Tribu de Ciudad Juárez Fútbol Club is a football club that plays in the Liga TDP. It is based in the city of Ciudad Juárez, Mexico.

History
The team was founded in 2012 as a result of the name change of Club Colegio de Bachilleres de Ciudad Juárez and after the dissolution of Indios de Ciudad Juárez, it played its first official match on October 21 of the same year, drawing two goals against Chinarras de Aldama.

The club reached the final phase for promotion in the years 2013, 2014, 2016, 2019 and 2021. Having its best participation in 2021 where it eliminated the clubs FCD Santiago Nuevo León, Aguacateros de Peribán and Gorilas de Juanacatlán to reach the semifinals zone.

Stadium
The team plays its matches at home in the Complejo La Tribu, which has a capacity to accommodate 500 spectators, in the 2021 media announced that a new stadium is being built. The full capacity is still unknown.

Players

First-team squad

References

External links 

Liga MX Official Profile

Football clubs in Chihuahua (state)
Association football clubs established in 2012
2012 establishments in Mexico
Sports teams in Ciudad Juárez